Iceland has a state-centred, publicly funded universal healthcare system and health insurance that covers the whole population. The number of private providers in Iceland has increased. The healthcare system is largely paid for by taxes (84%) and to some extent by service fees (16%) and is administrated by the Ministry of Health. A considerable portion of government spending is assigned to healthcare. There is almost no private health insurance in Iceland and no private hospitals. In very limited cases (e.g. skin diseases), access to a private provider can be reimbursement for services provided that the conditions are met.

Financing and funding 
The healthcare system in Iceland is financed with the taxes raised by the central government. This is affected by the Nordic welfare state model, in which public service is heavily funded through taxation to support the general public, in order for the population to have equal access to health care and welfare system. Although local authorities have limited influence over the national health care system, Iceland has adapted to similar structures to other Nordic countries, implementing decentralized structure by dividing the country into seven local health care regions. The health care regions were implemented to promote cooperations between institutions, and to provide quality care through regional provisions. However, this has not affected the financial responsibility of the central government. Although healthcare is to a great extent funded through taxation, some out-of-pocket expenses are still required, such as service fees, of which some groups are exempted, for example children, the disabled and elderly people 

As of 2018, out-of-pocket expenditure is at 16% of total healthcare expenditure, similar to levels of 2007 and 2008 but significantly lower than it was both at 2001 (19,5%) and 2021 (18,5%). The general population has shown overwhelming support for universal healthcare and governmental funding. Through a research survey conducted in 2013 focused on Icelandic adults, in which 94% of the respondents want the government to spend more on public health care, and 81% of the respondents prefer and supports primary health care to be provided by the government. 

According to a study in The Lancet, the Icelandic healthcare system has the world's second best Healthcare Access and Quality Index, a composite measure collected as a part of the Global Burden of Disease Study.

Healthcare services

Primary care 
Health centers that provide primary health care are located throughout the country, while some runs along smaller institutes and hospitals, all are funded and administered by central government. In accordance with the 1973 Health Care Act, which established universal primary health care and increase the amount of health personnel and institutes in the country, all patients are required to register and access through a primary care center and a general practitioner of their choice. Specialist services are provided mainly by general practitioners, privately operated or publicly funded.

Secondary care 
There are a total of 6 regional hospitals and 16 health institutions throughout the country, funded through fixed global budgets. The main hospital is located in Reykjavik. Most hospital professionals and doctors are salaried employees, and are paid through hospital budgets. Doctors can also see private patients outside of the hospitals if they receive 80 percent or less.

Long-term care 
Long-term care can be accessed through institutions or at home. These includes personal assistance and domestic care, including nursing homes or child care. These services are provided by either private institutes or public services, and are funded through national budgets. Part-time and home-based child care are payable but subsidized, priority are given to special interest groups.

Medical training
Iceland does not have its own specialist medical training system, so Icelandic doctors typically spend 8 or 10 years working abroad before returning to the country.  They often use the relationship established in training for ongoing support.

Healthcare districts

See also
 Health in Iceland

References

External links
Ministry of Health 
Ministry of Health 

Ice